"In My Own Time" is a song and single written by Roger Chapman and John Whitney and performed by British group, Family.

It was first released in 1971. It entered the UK singles chart in July reaching number 4 and stayed for thirteen weeks on the chart. The song peaked at number 86 in Australia.

References 

1971 songs
Songs written by Roger Chapman
Family (band) songs
Songs written by John "Charlie" Whitney
1971 singles
Reprise Records singles